The Bishopric of Chiemsee was a Roman Catholic diocese. While based on the islands of the Chiemsee in Bavaria, Germany, most of its territory lay in the County of Tyrol, Austria. The bishopric ceased to be a residential see in 1808. and accordingly is today listed by the Catholic Church as a titular see.

Establishment
The Bishopric of Chiemsee was established by the Archbishop of Salzburg, Eberhard II of Regensberg, on the islands of the Chiemsee in 1215. It followed the precedent set by his predecessor Gebhard, who had established the Bishopric of Gurk in 1072. This system of founding quite small suffragan dioceses was to be completed by the setting up of the bishoprics of Seckau in 1218 and Lavant in 1225. It was caused by the fact, that, after a large increase in size, stretching its borders from the Inn river in Bavaria to the Hungarian border, the archdiocese of Salzburg became hard to govern. Both the Holy Roman Emperor and the Pope gave their consent and support to the establishment of the bishopric in 1213.

Structure
All bishops of Chiemsee were selected by the Archbishops, for the bishops were the most important supporters of the archbishops. The bishops usually served as auxiliary bishops or fulfilled other duties for the archbishops. Locally the ruling of the bishopric rested mostly with the archdeacons who, supported by the Dukes of Bavaria, prevented the bishops from residing in the bishopric. Therefore, the Bishops never became prince-bishops of the Empire, unlike most other ecclesiarchs. Thus the bishopric should not be considered as a state of the Holy Roman Empire, but as a territory within the state of the archbishopric. Accordingly, the bishops held a seat in the archbishoprics diet.

At first, the nuns monastery of Frauenchiemsee was to be the seat of the bishopric, but subsequently, the monks monastery church of the nearbyBenedictine Abbey of Herrenchiemsee was chosen to be the diocesan cathedral. In fact, the seat of the bishopric was the so-called Chiemseehof in the city of Salzburg. This building nowadays is used by the parliament and the government of the State of Salzburg.

The bishopric was rather small, consisting of 10 parishes when it was created, and finally 11in 1804, mostly consisting of exclaves in the vicinity of St. Johann in Tirol.

The best known bishop was Berthold Pürstinger (1508 - 1525) who twice used his influence to save innocent people from (the town-councillors in 1511, and the peasants in 1524); after retiring from office became a noted humanist.

Abolition
Together with the secularisation of the archbishopric in 1803, the bishopric also lost its territorial function. In 1808 the diocese was abolished after the last bishop waived his rights. Temporarily under the rule of the Ordinariate of the Bishopric of Freising, the Austrian parts returned to Salzburg and were added to the Bishopric of Brixen in 1817/18, the rest becoming a regular part of the newly renamed Archbishopric of Munich-Freising.

List of Bishops of Chiemsee (1216 - 1808)

Notes

References

External links

 Diocese of Chiemsee at catholic-hierarchy.org
 Titular Episcopal See of Chiemsee at gcatholic.org
 Article about the Bishopric of Chiemsee at Historisches Lexikon Bayerns (German)

Former Roman Catholic dioceses in Germany
Roman Catholic dioceses in the Holy Roman Empire
Catholic titular sees in Europe
States and territories established in 1216
States and territories disestablished in 1803
Former states and territories of Bavaria